Shadows in Paradise is a 2010 American action film directed and written by producer, director, and writer J. Stephen Maunder and starring Mark Dacascos, Armand Assante, Tom Sizemore, and Sofya Skya.

Plot 
During a rescue operation in Iraq, Special Forces member Max Forrester (Mark Dacascos) is devastated when Sasha (Sofya Skya), his squad mate and fiancée, goes missing. Two years later, Max, now out of the military, receives a call from his ex-commander, Captain Dyer (Bruce Boxleitner), informing him that Sasha has been seen alive and moving freely about on a place called Paradise Island. He also informs Max the military is preparing to go in and extract her with possible charges of desertion or worse. Max sets off on his own to Paradise Island to find Sasha and learn the truth before Shadow Company gets to her first. Max eventually finds Sasha and learns she is working undercover as part of Al-Qaeda and is about to expose a weapons deal that will have a heavy impact on their organization. The story culminates in a battle wherein it is revealed that Shadow Company, led by their leader Ghost (Armand Assante), are in fact the weapons dealers who were using Sasha as an alibi to come to the island. Max and Sasha foil the weapons deal and recover the weapons in a spectacular showdown.

External links 
 
 

2010 films
2010 action films
Iraq War films
American action films
2010s English-language films
2010s American films